Mopidevi Venkataramana Rao (born 1962, Nizampatam) is an Indian politician, who has been the Excise minister under Kiran Kumar Reddy and most recently represented the Repalle, Bapatla constituency in the Andhra Pradesh Legislature.   He also served as Ports, infrastructure and investments minister under Y. S. Rajasekhara Reddy.He was elected to the Rajya Sabha, upper house of the Parliament of India from Andhra Pradesh in the 2020 Rajyasabha elections as a member of the YSR Congress Party.

Personal life
He is S/o late. Mopidevi Veeraragaviah, He has completed his graduation from Loyola degree college, Vijayawada

Political career
Mopidevi is an eminent leader from BC Caste who carried a cult image in Andhra Pradesh. He dedicated his career for the development of all communities of Repalle and Nizampatnam area.

in 1989, 1994 he contested and lost from Kuchinapudi Assembly Constituency. 
In 1999, 2004 he won from Kuchinapudi Assembly Constituency. 
In 2009, he won from Repalle Assembly Constituency.
In 2014, 2019 he lost from Repalle Assembly Constituency.

References

1964 births
Living people
YSR Congress Party politicians
Rajya Sabha members from Andhra Pradesh
Indian National Congress politicians from Andhra Pradesh